Hardcore Breakout USA is an internationally distributed compilation album mostly of artists that are on New Red Archives records.  It was originally released in 1990 as a double LP and cassette, but was then subsequently also released as a CD. The album was compiled by New Red Archives. The New Red Archives 1990 pressing of the album was issued as a single LP. The Japanese version Snowboard Addiction - Fun Ride, was released in 1994 and a second edition, Hardcore Breakout USA Volume 2, was compiled and released, in 1995.

Track listing

Hardcore Breakout USA
Part 1
 "Jolt" - Ultraman 1:58
 "Rich" - Jawbreaker 2:58
 "Indigestion" - Samiam 2:41
 "Stand Up And Fight" - Bedlam Hour 1:50
 "Shave Clean" - Crucial Youth 0:53
 "Full On" - Hogan's Heroes 1:24
 "New Queen" - Samiam 2:23
 "Those Who Curse" - Crucial Youth 1:19
 "Zombies" - Kraut 1:55
 "You Popped My Life" - G Whizz 2:37
 "Threat Of Power" - Dirge 2:06
 "Its About Time" - Agitators 1:40

Part 2
 "Turn To Ice" - Ultraman 2:14
 "Home Sweet Home" - Samiam 1:53
 "Unemployed" - Kraut 2:17
 "Positive Dental Outlook" - Crucial Youth 0:51
 "Megalopolis" - UK Subs 1:55
 "Breaking Your Rules" - Hogan's Heroes 3:59
 "Underground" - Samiam 3:40
 "Sabre Dance" - UK Subs 3:13
 "Reagan Youth" - Reagan Youth 1:19
 "Last Will" - Hogan's Heroes 1:49
 "Juvenile Justice" - Kraut 2:17
 "Frog Song" - P.E.D. 0:49

New Red Archives
 "Turn To Ice" - Ultraman 2:14
 "Home Sweet Home" - Samiam 1:53
 "Unemployed" - Kraut 2:17
 "Positive Dental Outlook" - Crucial Youth 0:51
 "Megalopolis" - UK Subs 1:55
 "Breaking Your Rules" - Hogan's Heroes 3:59
 "Underground" - Samiam 3:40
 "Sabre Dance" - UK Subs 3:13
 "Reagan Youth" - Reagan Youth 1:19
 "Last Will" - Hogan's Heroes 1:49
 "Juvenile Justice" - Kraut 2:17
 "Frog Song" - P.E.D. 0:49

Reception
Maximum RockNRolls founder Tim Yohannan said of Hardcore Breakout USA  "...current Top 15 list"
Maximum RockNRoll'''s Walter Glaser said of Hardcore Breakout USA  "...current Top 15 list"Maximum RockNRolls Martin Sprouse said of Hardcore Breakout USA''  "...current Top 15 list"

Uncredited
George Barberio - album and CD covers 
Noah Uman - front cover photography

References

1990 compilation albums
Record label compilation albums
Hardcore punk compilation albums
New Red Archives compilation albums
Punk rock compilation albums
1990 albums
New Red Archives albums
Metalcore compilation albums